Angus John Russell (born 7 April 1930) is a Canadian rower. He competed in the men's eight event at the 1952 Summer Olympics.

References

1930 births
Living people
Canadian male rowers
Olympic rowers of Canada
Rowers at the 1952 Summer Olympics
Place of birth missing (living people)